Santiago Magallán (born 8 May 1992) is an Argentine footballer who plays for Spanish club UE Llagostera as a midfielder.

References

External links
Santiago Magallán profile at BDFA 

1992 births
Living people
Footballers from La Plata
Argentine footballers
Association football midfielders
Argentine Primera División players
Club de Gimnasia y Esgrima La Plata footballers
San Lorenzo de Almagro footballers
Club Atlético Temperley footballers
Defensa y Justicia footballers
Unión de Santa Fe footballers
Segunda División B players
Cultural Leonesa footballers
CF Badalona players
UE Costa Brava players
Argentine expatriate footballers
Argentine expatriate sportspeople in Spain
Expatriate footballers in Spain